The 1900 Homestead Library & Athletic Club football team won the professional football championship of 1900.  The team was affiliated with the Homestead Library & Athletic Club in Homestead, Pennsylvania, near Pittsburgh.  The team featured a lineup of former college All-Americans paid by Pittsburgh Pirates' minority-owner William Chase Temple.

Organization
In 1898, William Chase Temple took over the Duquesne Country and Athletic Club, becoming the first individual team owner in professional football.  In 1900, most of the Duquesne players were hired by the Homestead Library & Athletic Club, by offering them higher salaries.

Over the next two season (1900 and 1901), Homestead fielded the best professional football team in the country and did not lose a game.  The 1900 team reportedly paid its player "from $50 to $100 a game plus 'expenses.'"

After two years as captain of the Duquesne team, Dave Fultz from Brown University was hired by Homestead and served as the team's captain.  Other players for the 1900 Homestead team included Pete Overfield (center from Penn), Bemus Pierce, Art Poe (end from Princeton), Otto Wagonhurst (from Penn), Charlie Gelbert (end from Penn), Bill Church (tackle from Princeton), John Hall (end from Yale), George Young (quarterback from Cornell), J. A. Gammons (from Brown University), Willis Richardson (from Brown), Artie Miller (from the Carlisle Indian School), Lewis (from Georgetown), Winstein (guard from Brown), Edward (guard from Princeton), and Kennedy (quarterback from the University of Chicago).

Season summary
Before the season, the schedule was announced as: October 6 vs. Pittsburgh College, October 13 vs. Altoona, October 20 @ Greensburg, October 27 vs. Detroit A.C., November 3 @ Latrobe, November 6 vs. Duquesne C. & A.C., November 10 vs. Greensburg, November 17 vs Lehigh, November 24 vs. Latrobe, November 29 vs. Bucknell.

Season schedule

See also
 1901 Homestead Library & Athletic Club football team

References

Homestead Library & Athletic Club
Homestead Library and Athletic Club football seasons
Homestead Library & Athletic Club football